The  represents Japan at the International Ice Hockey Federation's Women's World Championships, the Winter Olympics, and at other international ice hockey tournaments. The women's national team is governed by the Japan Ice Hockey Federation. Japan had 2,587 registered female players in 2017 and 1,439 as of 2020.

Tournament record

Olympic Games
1998 – Finished in 6th place
2014 – Finished in 7th place
2018 – Finished in 6th place
2022 – Finished in 6th place

World Championship
1990 – Finished in 8th place
1999 – Finished in 9th place (1st in Group B, Promoted to Top Division)
2000 – Finished in 8th place (Relegated to Division I).
2001 – Finished in 10th place (2nd in Division I).
2003 – Finished in 9th place (1st in Group B, Promoted to Top Division)
2004 – Finished in 9th place (Relegated to Division I)
2005 – Finished in 10th place (2nd in Division I)
2007 – Finished in 10th place (1st in Group B, Promoted to Top Division)
2008 – Finished in 7th place
2009 – Finished in 8th place (Relegated to Division I)
2011 – Withdrew from the tournament due to an earthquake
2012 – Finished in 11th place (3rd in Division IA)
2013 – Finished in 9th place (1st in Division IA, Promoted to Top Division)
2015 – Finished in 7th place
2016 – Finished in 8th place (Relegated to Division I)
2017 – Finished in 9th place (1st in Division IA, Promoted to Top Division)
2019 – Finished in 8th place
2020 – Cancelled due to the COVID-19 pandemic
2021 – Finished in 6th place
2022 – Finished in 5th place

Asian Games
1996 – Finished in 2nd place 
1999 – Finished in 2nd place 
2003 – Finished in 2nd place 
2007 – Finished in 2nd place 
2011 – Finished in 2nd place 
2017 – Finished in 1st place

IIHF Challenge Cup of Asia
 2010 – Finished in 2nd place  
 2011 – Finished in 1st place  
 2012 – Finished in 1st place

Pacific Rim Championship
1995 – Finished in 4th place
1996 – Finished in 4th place

Team

Current roster
Roster for the 2022 IIHF Women's World Championship.

Head coach: Yuji Iizuka

Notable former players
Nonaka Emi
Masako Sato
Rie Sato
Adachi Yurie

Coaches
1990 World Championship – Noriko Fukuda
1995 to 1998 – Wally Kozak (coach-mentor)
1998 Winter Olympics – Toru Itabashi (head coach), Tsutomu Kawabuchi
1999 World Championship B – Takayuki Hatanda
2000 World Championship – Takayuki Hatanda
2001 World Championship D1 – Takayuki Hatanda
2003 World Championship D1 – Masayuki Takahashi
2004 World Championship – Kenji Nobuta (head coach), Tsutomu Kawabuchi (assistant coach, team manager)
2005 World Championship D1 – Kenji Nobuta
2007 World Championship D1 – Kohichi Satoh
2008 World Championship – Yuji Iizuka
2009 World Championship – Yuji Iizuka
2012 World Championship D1A – Yuji Iizuka
2013 World Championship D1A – Yuji Iizuka 
2014 Winter Olympics – Yuji Iizuka
2015 World Championship – Yoshifumi Fujisawa
2016 World Championship – Yoshifumi Fujisawa
2017 World Championship D1A – Takeshi Yamanaka
2018 Winter Olympics – Takeshi Yamanaka
2019 World Championship – Yuji Iizuka
Source: IIHF Guide & Record Book 2020

All-time record against other nations
Last match update: 10 March 2022

See also
Japan men's national ice hockey team
Japan women's national under-18 ice hockey team

References

External links

IIHF profile

 
Women's national ice hockey teams in Asia
Women's national sports teams of Japan
National team